Mettingham is a village and civil parish in the north of the English county of Suffolk. It had a population of 211 at the 2011 United Kingdom census.

The northern boundary of the parish is formed by the River Waveney which marks the county boundary with Norfolk. The northern section of the parish is within the area of The Broads National Park. The parish borders the parishes of Bungay, Shipmeadow, Ilketshall St John and the Norfolk parishes of Broome and Ellingham. The B1062 Bungay to Beccles road runs through the centre of the parish.

In the 1870s, Mettingham was described as:

 "a village and a parish in Wangford district, Suffolk. The village stands near the river Waveney, at the boundary with Norfolk, 2 miles E of Bungay r. station; is a scattered place; and has a postoffice under Bungay."

Its church, All Saints, is a round-tower church and about a mile to the south, Mettingham Castle comprises the ruins of a moated medieval fortified manor house, with a medieval monastic college, Mettingham College, in its grounds. The college was relocated to the site in 1394 and was dissolved in 1542 during the Dissolution of the Monasteries.

All Saints Church
All Saints is one of around 40 round-tower churches in Suffolk. It is a Grade I listed building which was restored in 1898. In 2012, the church was threatened with closure due to the theft of £16,000 worth of lead from its roof: there was insufficient money for repairs on top of daily running costs. The money was raised to replace the lead, but in October 2014, a further section of lead was taken. A cheaper material was used to fix the roof to avoid a recurrence.

Transport
The B1062 road runs through the centre of the parish. Mettingham has very limited public transport with a daily bus service. The closest railway station is Beccles,  to the east.

Notes

References

External links

Website with photos of Mettingham All Saints, a round-tower church

Villages in Suffolk
Civil parishes in Suffolk
Waveney District